All Saints’ Church, Hillesden is a  Grade I listed parish church in the Church of England in Hillesden, Buckinghamshire.

History

The church tower dates from the 15th century. The rest was rebuilt by the monks of Notley Abbey starting in 1493. It is built on a cruciform plan with aisles, north porch, chapel to north side of the chancel and an octagonal staircase on the outside of the north side which gives access to a vestry and above it a private chapel.

The south porch door was formerly in Hillesden House. It retains the bullet holes from the English Civil War when the village was attacked by Parliamentary Forces.

It was restored between 1874 and 1875 by George Gilbert Scott. He had been born in the nearby village of Gawcott and this building was one of the inspirations for his interest in Gothic architecture. He restored it for free. It was reopened on 16 June 1875. The roofs were replaced and a ceiling inserted with oak panels and mouldings. The old seats were restored and new ones made to match. The pulpit was remodelled. The screen was restored and installed to separate the chantry from the transepts. The Denton tomb in the chancel was repaired. The stained glass windows were relaid by Burlison and Grylls and a new window inserted which depicts the story of the parables.

It was restored again in the 1960s.

Incumbents
The names of the Minister or Curates from the time of the rebuilding of All Saints in 1493 are not all recorded for the church was appropriated in 1162 to Notley Abbey being served by a Monk or Canon of Notley up to the earliest recorded Curate in 1526.

All Saints was administered by the Diocese of Lincoln from records commencing 1902 to 1837, and thereafter by the Diocese of Oxford. After the Dissolution of the Monasteries, Hillesden was first granted to the Dean and Chapter of Christ Church, Oxford in 1542, and subsequently to the new foundation created by King Henry VIII in 1546. The Vicarage at Hillesden was rebuilt in 1869 and thereafter the ministers of All Saints were styled Vicars.

Parish status
The church is in a joint parish with:
St Cecilia's Church, Adstock
Holy Trinity Church, Gawcott
St Mary the Virgin's Church, Padbury

Stained glass

Memorials

Catharine Denton (d.1733)
Dr William Denton (d. 1691)
George Woodward (d. 1735)
Alexander Denton (d. 1576)
Elizabeth Denton (d. 1667)
Thomas Isham (d. 1676)
Godfrey Boate (d. 1722)
Mary Rowe, Viscountess of Hillsborough (d. 1742)

Organ

The pipe organ dates from 1970 and was built by George Osmund. A specification of the organ can be found on the National Pipe Organ Register.

References

Church of England church buildings in Buckinghamshire
Grade I listed churches in Buckinghamshire